California Gully is a suburb of Bendigo, Victoria, Australia. At the 2021 census, California Gully had a population of 4,476. California Gully is named for the Californian miners who rushed to the area when gold was discovered in 1852.

References

Suburbs of Bendigo
Bendigo
Australian places named after U.S. places or U.S. history